Petter Mads Fladeby (born April 1, 1961 in Denmark) is a sound designer and mixer working mainly in Norwegian films. Fladeby received the Amanda Award for Best Sound Design in 2008 for the movie O' Horten, and in 2015 for the movie Børning.

Filmography 

Department Q: A conspiracy of Faith (2016)
Louder Than Bombs (2015)
1001 Grams (2014)
Børning (2014)
Call Girl (2012)
Sons of Norway (2011)
Headhunters (2011)
King of Devil's Island (2010)
Trollhunter (2010)
Home for Christmas (2010)
Trust Me (2010)
Tuba Atlantic (2010)
East End Angels (2010)
A Somewhat Gentle Man (2010)
Magic Silver (2009)
Max Manus: Man of War (2008)
Let the Right One In (2008)
O' Horten (2007)
5 Lies (2007)
Kill Buljo: The Movie (2007)
Peter & the Wolf (2006)
Storm (2005)
Kissed by Winter (2005)
The Beatuiful Country (2004)
Buddy (2003)
Svidd neger (2003)
Jonny Vang (2003)
Kitchen Stories (2003)
Prozac Nation (2001)
Bride of the Wind (2001)
Before the Storm (2000)
Aberdeen (2000)
Ballen i øyet (2000)
Saving Grace (2000)
Misery Harbour (1999)
Sophie's World (1999)
Suffløsen (1999)
Absolute Hangover (1999)
Cellofan - med døden til følge (1998)
Sista kontraktet (1998)
Burnt by Frost (1997)
Body Troopers (1996)
Zero Kelvin (1995)
Dangerous Waters (1995)
Over Stork og stein (1994)
Cross My Heart and Hope to Die (1994)
Secondløitnanten (1993)
Sofie (1992)
Det perfekte mord (1992)
The Polar Bear King (1991)
The White Viking (1991)
A Year Along the Abandoned Road (1991)
Herman (1990)
A Handful of Time (1989)
Dykket (1989)
Brun bitter (1988)
Blücher (1988)
The Pinchcliffe Grand Prix (1975)

Awards

References

External links 

1961 births
Living people
Norwegian film people
Production sound mixers
Sound designers
Danish emigrants to Norway
Guldbagge Award winners